Sphaeniscus atilius is a species of tephritid or fruit flies in the genus Sphaeniscus of the family Tephritidae.

Distribution
They are found in India, Siberia, Japan, and southeast Australasia.

References

Tephritinae
Insects described in 1849
Diptera of Asia